Dejan Lazović (born 8 February 1990) is a Montenegrin professional water polo player. He is currently playing for the VPS and Italian Pallanuoto Sport Management. He is 6 ft 6 in (199 cm) tall and weighs 225 lb (102 kg).

References

External links 

 Portal Antena M - Dejan Lazović nakon meča sa Španijom
 Portal Antena M - vaterpolo Budimpešta Čučković, Lazović i Gojković
 Dejan Lazović on Instagram
 Lazović: Biće napad bolji kada počne Svjetsko prvenstvo
 Water-Polo : Dejan Lazovic rejoint Marseille
 Dejan LAZOVIC | Profile | FINA Official

1990 births
Living people
Montenegrin male water polo players
Mediterranean Games bronze medalists for Montenegro
Mediterranean Games medalists in water polo
Competitors at the 2018 Mediterranean Games